"Heartbreak Song" is a song recorded by American country artist Mickey Guyton for her forthcoming debut studio album. It was released as her second single through Capitol Records Nashville on June 3, 2016. Guyton co-wrote the song with Mark Trussell and April Geesbreght in response to the subject of her previous single, "Better Than You Left Me", bragging about inspiring the hit.

Content
"Heartbreak Song" is a country pop song written by Mickey Guyton, Mark Trussell, and April Geesbreght and produced by Trussell. A "thumping" bass line carries the track, while Guyton delivers "straight-to-the-point", "incisive" lyrics with a "soulful" delivery. The song was inspired by Guyton's ex-boyfriend, who was also the subject of previous single, "Better Than You Left Me", after Guyton learned that the man was "bragging" that she "wrote [the song] about him." Critics have noted thematic similarities with her debut single in contrast to the more upbeat tone and more pop-leaning production.

Critical reception
The staff of Taste of Country noted that the song is less of a "vocal showcase" than her previous single, but that Guyton "continues to prove her worth as a fine storyteller" on the track. The blog also praised the song's radio-friendly sound.

Chart performance

Weekly charts

Release history

References

2016 songs
2016 singles
Capitol Records Nashville singles
Mickey Guyton songs
Songs written by Mickey Guyton